Aird of Sleat is a village on the Isle of Skye in Scotland. Lying  from Point of Sleat, it is the southernmost settlement on Skye. A track leads from the village to the Point of Sleat Lighthouse.

The village is home to the Aird Old Church which is now converted into an art gallery.

References

External links
 Aird Old Church Art Gallery Website

Populated places in the Isle of Skye